Bodybuilding was an Asian Games event from 2002 to 2006. Bodybuilding is no longer an event at the Games because of the judging controversy during the 2006 Asian Games.

Events

Medal table

Participating nations

List of medalists

References
ABBF

 
Sports at the Asian Games
Asian Games